Athlone was a railway station on the Strzelecki line in South Gippsland, Victoria, Australia. The station was opened in 1922, and was closed on 7 August 1941 following flooding of the Lang Lang River, which resulted in damage to one of the four trestle bridges over the river, after which the line was closed back to Yannathan station.

Station facilities
Upon opening of the line in 1922, Athlone station was supplied with sheep yards, passenger facilities, an oil driven water pumping plant and water tower as well as departmental residence.

Disused railway stations in Victoria (Australia)
Railway stations in Australia opened in 1922
Railway stations closed in 1941
Shire of Baw Baw